El Hombre de las Narices, Home dels nassos ("Man of the noses") is a mythological character whose tradition is kept in Catalonia and other regions from Spain like Aragon, La Rioja, Navarre, Álava, Burgos, etc. The legend says that this man has as many noses as the year has days, and loses one every day and can only be seen on December 31.  In this way, children of Catalonia are led to believe that there is a man with 365 noses, and they are asked to search him on last day of the year. Being the last day of the year, he has only one nose remaining, the rest have been already lost.

References 

Spanish mythology
Catalan mythology
Catalan words and phrases